German submarine U-123 was a Type IXB U-boat of Nazi Germany's Kriegsmarine that operated during World War II. After that conflict, she became the French submarine Blaison (Q165) until she was decommissioned on 18 August 1959.

Construction
U-123 was laid down on 15 April 1939 at the AG Weser yard in Bremen as yard number 955. She was launched on 2 March 1940 and commissioned on 30 May, with Kapitänleutnant Karl-Heinz Moehle (Crew 30) in command. He was relieved on 19 May 1941 by Kptlt. Reinhard Hardegen (Crew 33), who was relieved in turn on 1 August 1942 by his watch officer, Oberleutnant zur See Horst von Schroeter (Crew 37b). He remained in command until the boat was decommissioned on 17 June 1944.

Design
German Type IXB submarines were slightly larger than the original German Type IX submarines, later designated IXA. U-123 had a displacement of  when at the surface and  while submerged. She had two shafts and two  propellers.

U-123 was fitted with six  torpedo tubes (four fitted at the bow and two at the stern), 22 torpedoes, one  SK C/32 naval gun, 180 rounds, and a  SK C/30 as well as a  C/30 anti-aircraft gun. The boat had a complement of forty-eight.

Service history
U-123 conducted 12 war patrols, sinking 45 ships, totalling  and 683 displacement tons, and damaging six others, totaling .

First patrol
U-123s first patrol began with her departure from Kiel on 21 September 1940. Her route took her across the North Sea, through the gap between the Faroe and Shetland Islands and into the Atlantic Ocean west of Ireland. She sank six ships in October, including Shekatika which was hit with no less than five torpedoes before she went to the bottom east southeast of Rockall. Nevertheless, her partial load of pit-props floated free before she went down.

The boat docked at Lorient in occupied France on 23 October.

Second patrol
U-123 returned to the same general area for her second patrol as for her first. She was also almost as successful, sending another five merchantmen to the bottom. The voyage was marred on 17 November 1940 when Mechanikergefreiter Fritz Pfeifer was lost overboard. After sinking the British convoy straggler, the ore-carrier SS Cree (torpedoed and sunk with the loss of all hands on 21 November) the boat was seriously damaged on 3 November by a collision with an unknown object ("probably a convoy vessel").

She returned to Lorient on 28 November.

Third patrol
Her score rose steadily, sinking another four ships. There were no survivors.

Fourth patrol
Venturing further west of Ireland on her fourth sortie, the boat sank one ship, Venezuela on 17 April 1941. This was another vessel which required five torpedoes to ensure her destruction. There were also no survivors.

Having set-out from Lorient on 10 April, she returned to the same port on 11 May.

Fifth patrol
Patrol number five was conducted in the Atlantic, but in the vicinity of the Azores and the Canary Islands. Her first victim this time out was Ganda, a 4,333 GRT neutral registered in Portugal. She went down on 20 June 1941. Following her sinking with torpedoes and gunfire, it was realised what her status was. On her return to Lorient, U-123s war diary (KTB) was altered on the order of U-boat headquarters (BdU).

She was also unsuccessfully attacked by convoy escorts west of Portugal on 12 August, although she sustained moderate damage.

Sixth patrol
Despite criss-crossing the Atlantic, U-123 found the pickings rather thin, she did manage to damage the armed merchant cruiser (AMC)  on 21 October 1941 and take one crewman prisoner. The ship had been travelling behind Convoy SL-89 with five other AMCs. The vessel was hit by two torpedoes but empty drums in the holds kept her afloat. A 25 degree list was reduced to 15 degrees; men had abandoned ship prematurely – hence the PoW. The ship continued her voyage, albeit at reduced speed.

Seventh patrol
U-123 took part in the opening of Unternehmen Paukenschlag ("Operation Drumbeat"), also called the "Second Happy Time" in January 1942. Moving down the coast, she sank Norness, Coimbra, Octavian , Norvana, City of Atlanta and the Latvian Ciltvaira. She approached New York's Lower Bay on the evening of 14th Jan and viewed an illuminated New York City. She was also credited with sinking San Jose on 17 January, although this ship was actually lost in a collision. The Malay was only damaged because Hardegen had under-estimated her size and chose to use the deck gun rather than a torpedo. In a reference to American unpreparedness, he commented after sinking Norvana: "These are some pretty buoys we are leaving for the Yankees in the harbor approaches as replacement for the lightships."

U-123 was attacked by an aircraft off New York City, but withdrew without any damage being sustained. She also had a lucky escape on 19 January when Kosmos II (headed by Captain Einar Gleditsch from Sandefjord Norway) tried to ram the boat off Oregon Inlet. The U-boat escaped when the recalcitrant power plant was restarted at the last minute and flares were fired at the larger vessel's bridge.

The Culebra and Pan Norway were also sunk off Bermuda. By now out of torpedoes and in the case of Pan Norway, the boat used the last of her deck gun ammunition and 37 mm AA weapon to destroy the Norwegian vessel. The U-boat then encountered a Greek ship, the Mount Aetna, under a Swiss charter, which was directed to the survivors.

Eighth patrol
The boat's second Paukenschlag mission was also successful – sinking Muskogee and Empire Steel on 22 and 23 March 1942 near Bermuda before moving closer to the US east coast.

This disguised merchantman was hit on the port side, the crew started to abandon ship on the starboard side. The U-boat moved closer, at which point Atik dropped her concealment and opened fire with all weapons. U-123 ran off, (one man died in the action), but she dived, returned and sank the American vessel with a torpedo. There were no survivors.

This was Captain Reinhard Hardegen's second patrol in charge and quoted from U123 K.T.B war patrol log the following:  F.z.See Holzer was buried at sea the following day.

The boat proceeded to sink or damage another eight ships; many of them resting on the sea bed in the shallow water with parts of their hulls above the surface. Another vessel, Gulfamerica was fatally struck about five miles from Jacksonville, Florida on 11 April. Nineteen crewmen were killed in the attack. She did not sink until 16 April.

The boat then returned to Lorient on 2 May and proceeded to steam to Bergen in Norway before carrying out a series of short journeys to Kristiansand, Aarhus, Kiel and Stettin.

Ninth patrol
For her ninth patrol, U-123 left Kiel on 5 December 1942 and returned to the Atlantic. U-123 also damaged Empire Shackleton, a Catapult Armed Merchantman north of the Azores.

The boat returned to Lorient on 6 February 1943.

Tenth patrol
U-123 sailed to the West African coast. She sank the Spanish-registered motor ship  on 8 April 1943 west of Conakry, French Guinea. As per maritime rules, the neutral ship had the Spanish flag painted in both sides. Commander Horst von Schroeter ordered the shooting of 3 torpedoes and she sunk in less than a minute. The submarine surfaced, the commander asked from the conning tower "What ship?" to the survivors. Although being confirmed he had just sunk a neutral ship, he left without giving any assistance to the 40 men adrift (five went down with the ship).

A few days later the   rescued 29 survivors from a boat. 11 on a separated raft died. The affair was hushed-up by the government of Franco; indeed, the survivors were ordered to shut-up. The career of Commander Horst von Schroeter was unaffected by this affair and after the war he even became a NATO commander.

She sank Empire Bruce on the same day, also southwest of Sierra Leone. She sank three more ships off Monrovia on 29 April, 5 May and 9 May. This included the Holmbury, which was sunk on 5 May by two torpedoes and gunfire. The crew (minus 2 firemen who were killed by the first torpedo) survived, after sailing to the Liberian coast in the one remaining lifeboat. The captain, J B Lawson, was taken aboard U-123, where he was treated impeccably by Von Schroeter. Von Schroeter promised to send relevant photographs to Lawson a year after the war had ended – and did.

Eleventh patrol
U-123 was depth charged off Cape Finisterre (northwest Spain), by Allied escort vessels on approximately 25 August 1943. She was also attacked by a British De Havilland ('Tse Tse') Mosquito of No. 618 Squadron RAF on 7 November 1943; this aircraft, piloted by Flying Officer A.J.L. Bonnett of the Royal Canadian Air Force,  was armed with a 6-pounder (57 mm) Molins gun and this was the first attack on a U-boat with one of these weapons. Bonnett fired eight rounds at U-123 and achieved several hits on the submarine's conning tower and hull. The boat was rendered unable to dive by a  hole in the pressure hull. One crewman, Bootsmaat Günther Struve was killed and two others wounded.

Twelfth patrol
U-123s last patrol was her longest – 107 days, but after the incidents of the previous eleven, it was a bit of an anti-climax. She returned to Lorient unable to repeat her success, on 24 April 1944.

Loss and French service
The boat was taken out of service at Lorient on 17 June 1944, she was scuttled there on 19 August. She was raised by the French in 1945 after Germany's surrender, and became the French submarine Blaison (Q165). She was decommissioned on 18 August 1959.

Summary of raiding history

See also
 U-Boote westwärts!, Nazi propaganda film in which U-123 was used

References

Notes

Citations

Bibliography

External links

 S.S. Oklahoma and Esso Baton Rouge historical marker at St. Simons Island, Georgia

German Type IX submarines
Ships built in Bremen (state)
1940 ships
U-boats commissioned in 1940
World War II submarines of Germany
G
Cold War submarines of France
Maritime incidents in August 1944